Chewit may refer to:

 Scratching
 A brand of square fruit-flavoured sweet: Chewits
 The northern lapwing